Television is the third and final album by American rock band Television. It was released in 1992, 14 years after the band's second studio album and subsequent breakup in 1978. A video for "Call Mr. Lee" was filmed and briefly aired on MTV.

Reception 

Television has been generally well received by critics. Rock critic Robert Christgau wrote, "I prefer the more rocking, songful old Television, but it's a tribute to Tom Verlaine's conceptual restlessness and force of personality that in a world where alternative guitar means making noise or mixing and matching from the used bins, these four veterans have regrouped with a distinct new sonic identity. Droll, warm-hearted, sophisticated, cryptic, jazzy yet unjazzlike, they sound like nothing else—except, just a little, old Television". David Fricke of Rolling Stone said, "It was worth waiting fifteen years." Per Milo Miles of The New York Times, "Trying to adjust after a long layoff, these musicians have assembled a scaled-down Television, though one with exquisite design details." Ira Robbins of Entertainment Weekly hailed it as "a shadowy album no less edgy or atmospheric than their first two. The band’s filigree of interwoven guitar patterns has gained in maturity and refinement, but songwriter-singer Verlaine’s unique vision still comes through loud and clear."

Track listing 
All songs written by Television

 "1880 or So" – 3:41
 "Shane, She Wrote This" – 4:21
 "In World" – 4:12
 "Call Mr. Lee" – 4:16
 "Rhyme" – 4:47
 "No Glamour for Willi" – 5:00
 "Beauty Trip" – 4:22
 "The Rocket" – 3:23
 "This Tune" – 3:42
 "Mars" – 4:56

Personnel 
Television
 Billy Ficca – drums, production
 Richard Lloyd – guitar, production
 Fred Smith – bass, vocals, guitar, executive production, mixing
 Tom Verlaine – vocals, guitar, executive production, mixing

Technical
 Vera Beren – production assistance
 Joe Brescio – mastering
 Patrick A. Derivaz – engineering assistance
 Mario Salvati – engineering, mixing

References

External links 
 

1992 albums
Capitol Records albums
Television (band) albums